Jakarta Inner Ring Road, also known as the Jakarta Inner-City Toll Road is a toll road circling the city of Jakarta, Indonesia. On northern and the eastern section, the toll road is grade-separated with the Sosrobahu road construction technique (also used in the Metro Manila Skyway and one half of the Sheikh Mohammed bin Zayed Skyway). The toll road is operated by PT Jasa Marga (Persero) Tbk, a state-owned enterprise, and PT Citra Marga Nushapala Persada Tbk (CMNP), founded by the Suharto family which is also the initiator of the Metro Manila Skyway.

History
The stretch of Jakarta Inner Ring Road began with the opening of Jalan Jenderal Gatot Subroto which intersect the Sudirman Road at the Semanggi cloverleaf bridge which already under construction since the 1960s. In the early 1970s, the Gatot Subroto Road had continued past Tebet and becoming M.T. Haryono Road to Cawang and meet the junction with Major Jendral Panjaitan Road. In the 1970s, another major road runs Jendral Achmad Yani Road and Laksamana Yos Sudarso Road were established to the far east of Jakarta. This road would connect the Semanggi cloverleaf interchange all the way to the port Tanjung Priok. This vitally important highway which connects Central Jakarta directly with the port is the prototype of Jakarta Inner Ring Road, known then as "Jakarta Bypass", so called because the new connection enabling trucks to "bypass the rest of Jakarta while traveling to and from the port." Construction of Jakarta Bypass was funded using the United States financial assistant and was completed in 1963.

Jakarta Bypass also enabled the growth of new suburbs of Cempaka Putih, Pulo Mas, Senen, Rawamangun and Salemba.

Section
Jakarta Inner Ring Road has several sections:

 Cawang–Pluit Toll Road
 Harbor Toll Road
 Ir. Wiyoto Wiyono Toll Road

Gates and exits

Ir. Wiyoto Wiyono exits

Cawang–Pluit exits

Harbor Toll Road exits

Fee

See also

Jakarta Elevated Toll Road
Jakarta Outer Ring Road
Jakarta Outer Ring Road 2

References

Cited works

External links 
 PT Jasa Marga (Persero) Tbk
 PT Citra Marga Nusaphala Persada Tbk

Buildings and structures in Jakarta
Toll roads in Indonesia
Transport in Jakarta
Ring roads in Indonesia